Khuna is a rural locality (a selo) and the administrative centre of Khuninsky Selsoviet, Laksky District, Republic of Dagestan, Russia. The population was 180 as of 2010.

Geography 
Khuna is located 2 km east of Kumukh (the district's administrative centre) by road, on the right bank of the Khunnikh River. Turtsi and Shuni are the nearest rural localities.

Nationalities 
Laks live there.

References 

Rural localities in Laksky District